In molecular biology, the XPC binding domain is thought to play a role in DNA damage discrimination and in the enhancement of cell survival. They bind specifically and directly to the xeroderma pigmentosum group C protein (XPC) to initiate nucleotide excision repair (NER). Members of this entry adopt a structure consisting of four alpha helices, arranged in an array.

References

Protein domains
Protein families